Almond is a given name of the following people:
Almond Chu (born 1962), Hong Kong-based artist and photographer
Almond E. Fisher (1913–1982), United States Army officer
Almond Lee (born 1964), Hong Kong-based horse trainer
Almond Richards (1911–1992), Australian rules footballer
Almond Vosotros (born 1990), Filipino basketball player